Guyon Fernandez (born 18 April 1986) is a Curaçaoan professional footballer who plays as a forward for VV Smitshoek.

He formerly played for ADO Den Haag, Excelsior, Feyenoord, PEC Zwolle, NAC Breda, Perth Glory, Stal Dniprodzerzhynsk, Delhi Dynamos and FC Lienden.

Club career

ADO Den Haag
Fernandez started his professional career with ADO Den Haag in the Dutch Eerste Divisie. He played 11 matches in his first season in which he scored once.

Excelsior
In his first season in the Eredivisie, while playing for Excelsior, Fernandez was praised for performance in a victory against local rivals Feyenoord, in which he scored two goals. In March 2011 Fernandez was the subject of interest from Romanian side Steaua Bucharest.

Feyenoord
In May 2011, it was announced that Fernandez had signed for Feyenoord at the start of the 2011–12 season.
He was supposed to succeed Luc Castaignos who had left to Internazionale. In his first season Fernandez stood in a negative way. In November 2011, he received a six-game ban for hitting opposition player Rens van Eijden. Fernandez claimed he was reacting to racist abuse from van Eijden.

Loan spell PEC Zwolle
Fernandez was sent on loan for the 2013–14 season, after a lack of prospect with Feyenoord. On 20 April 2014, Fernandez scored twice in the first half as PEC Zwolle beat Ajax 5–1 in the KNVB Cup final.

NAC Breda
In October 2014 Fernandez was linked with a transfer to Bulgarian club Levski Sofia, following trials in Saudi Arabia and with Spanish club Real Valladolid. In November 2014, he began training with former club Excelsior. In January 2015 he went on trial with English club Sheffield Wednesday. On 12 January 2015, it was announced that Fernandez had signed a deal with NAC Breda until the end of the season.

Perth Glory
On 11 August 2015, it was announced that Fernandez signed with Australian A-League side Perth Glory. On 25 October 2015 Guyon Fernandez scored his first goal for Perth Glory against Adelaide United. Fernandez was released by Perth Glory in January 2016.

ADO Den Haag
He then returned to ADO Den Haag.

Delhi Dynamos
He signed for Delhi Dynamos on 12 September 2017, alongside Edu Moya. Fernandez was released by the Delhi Dynamos on 10 February 2018.

Return to the Netherlands
On 12 June 2019, Fernandez signed with Derde Divisie club FC Lienden. After a year, he moved to VV Smitshoek in the fifth tier.

International career
Fernandez was part of the squad for the Curaçao national team in the 2014 Caribbean Cup. In August 2015, he was called up by the then Curaçao manager Patrick Kluivert for the second time, for the Curaçao squad for the two World Cup qualification matches against El Salvador. Fernandez made his international debut for the Curaçao national team in a 1–1 friendly tie with Bolivia on 23 March 2018.

References

External links
 
 Guyon Fernandez interview at Vice
 

1986 births
Living people
Footballers from The Hague
Curaçao footballers
Curaçao international footballers
Dutch footballers
Dutch people of Curaçao descent
Association football forwards
2014 Caribbean Cup players
ADO Den Haag players
Excelsior Rotterdam players
Feyenoord players
PEC Zwolle players
NAC Breda players
Perth Glory FC players
FC Stal Kamianske players
Odisha FC players
FC Lienden players
VV Smitshoek players
Eredivisie players
Eerste Divisie players
A-League Men players
Ukrainian Premier League players
Indian Super League players
Dutch expatriate footballers
Expatriate soccer players in Australia
Dutch expatriate sportspeople in Australia
Expatriate footballers in Ukraine
Dutch expatriate sportspeople in Ukraine
Expatriate footballers in India
Dutch expatriate sportspeople in India